Willian Gabriel Galvão Forte (born 10 May 2000), commonly known as Willian Forte, is a Brazilian footballer who plays as defender.

Career statistics

Club

Notes

References

External links

2000 births
Living people
Brazilian footballers
Brazilian expatriate footballers
Association football defenders
UAE Pro League players
Paraná Clube players
Sociedade Esportiva Palmeiras players
Al-Ittihad Kalba SC players
Expatriate footballers in the United Arab Emirates
Brazilian expatriate sportspeople in the United Arab Emirates
Footballers from Curitiba